Buzza may refer to:

People
 Alan Buzza (born 1966), English cricket player and rugby union player
 Nathan Buzza (born 1970), Australian entrepreneur and investor
 Timothy Buzza (born 1964), American engineer
 Wylie Buzza (born 1996), Australian rules football player

Other
 Buzza Company Building, Minnesota, United States
 Buzza Tower, Isles of Scilly, United Kingdom